Batman: Vengeance is a 2001 action-adventure video game based on the fictional superhero of the same name. It was released for PlayStation 2, Game Boy Advance, GameCube, Xbox and Microsoft Windows. The game was developed and published by Ubi Soft in conjunction with Warner Bros. and DC Comics.

The game is based on the television series The New Batman Adventures, and features most actors from the show reprising their roles. The story centers on Batman's investigation of the Joker's apparent death after their latest encounter, while having to deal with other villains and their schemes, all part of a larger plot orchestrated by the Clown Prince of Crime. Batman: Vengeance received mixed reviews upon release.

Plot
Batman saves a woman named Mary from a bomb placed by the Joker at Gotham Chemicals, who is holding her son hostage for ransom. Using a transmitter, Batman tracks down the Joker and Mary to a partially demolished Gotham Bridge, where she is unmasked as Harley Quinn and the kidnapping scheme is revealed to be a plot to trap Batman. Batman defeats the Joker, but the latter falls off the bridge to his apparent death. Suspicious that the Joker survived, Batman lets Harley escape in order to monitor her using the transmitter.

Batman and Batgirl are alerted to Mr. Freeze attacking Gotham Industrial Research to kill scientist Isaac Evers, the creator of the miracle drug Promethium for cryogenically frozen people. Freeze seeks revenge against Evers for a promotional Promethium video he believes Evers sent to mock him. While pursuing Freeze, Batman uncovers Evers' dealings with the Joker, who funded his research after his initial government funding was cut because of Promethium being unstable. After saving Evers and defeating Freeze, Batman discovers Poison Ivy has created a new species of super-plants infested with deadly worms, and tracks her down to the remains of Gotham Chemicals. There, he finds Mayor Hamilton Hill, who explains Ivy blackmailed him and other wealthy socialites by poisoning them with her worm-infected plants, which were created from a mysterious chemical. Batman defeats Ivy and obtains an antidote to save her victims.

Batman witnesses the Joker's goons hijacking a blimp and speaks with Harley, who informs him that they have been operating on their own since the Joker's apparent death. After foiling their plan to send explosive Joker toys into the city's sewers, Batman finds an abducted Issac Evers. He explains that he had hired the goons to destroy Gotham Industrial for the insurance money, having been unable to collect on the damage left by Mr. Freeze without revealing his deals with the Joker. The goons then turned on him to carry out their plan to destroy Gotham using the toys. As Batman hands Evers over to the police, Commissioner Gordon is hit with a batarang. Blamed for the attack, Batman escapes from the police and concludes that Harley is behind everything since the Joker's apparent death. Disguising himself as a drifter to avoid police attention, Batman investigates the Joker's former hideout and finds evidence hinting at his survival.

After tracking the stolen blimp to the Gasworks, Batman confronts a still-living Joker, having faked his death to exact his true plan. He reveals that he secretly manipulated Evers, Freeze, Ivy, and Batman into fulfilling his goals to mass-produce a flammable Joker toxin developed from Promethium, which he intends to spread throughout the city's sewers. Batman shuts off the city's pipe network to stop the flow of the toxin, while the Joker attempts to escape in the blimp and spread the toxin himself. After subduing Harley, Batman stows aboard the blimp and stops the toxin from being released. As a last resort, the Joker tries to crash the blimp into the city, but Batman destroys the blimp and saves the Joker from falling to his death.

The villains are incarcerated at Arkham Asylum. Batman meets an apologetic Gordon, as it was discovered Harley threw the batarang, and thanks Batman for saving Gotham. Batman retreats to look out over the city, when the Bat-Signal appears behind him.

Development
Vengeance took environmental and character designs from The New Batman Adventures, and starred most of the main voice cast from both it and its predecessor, Batman: The Animated Series. The voice cast includes Kevin Conroy as Batman, Mark Hamill as the Joker, Tara Strong as Batgirl, Diane Pershing as Poison Ivy, Michael Ansara as Mr. Freeze, Efrem Zimbalist, Jr. as Alfred Pennyworth, Arleen Sorkin as Harley Quinn, Bob Hastings as Commissioner Gordon, and Lloyd Bochner as Mayor Hill.

Reception

Batman Vengeance received "mixed or average reviews" across all versions of the game, according to review aggregator Metacritic.

Jeff Lundrigan reviewed the PlayStation 2 version of the game for Next Generation, rating it three stars out of five, and stated that "While it has a number of things going for it, Batman Vengeance still comes up short in a few key areas."

The Academy of Interactive Arts & Sciences nominated Batman: Vengeance for its 2001 "Outstanding Achievement in Original Musical Composition" award, which ultimately went to Tropico.

By the end of 2001, sales of Batman: Vengeance had surpassed 540,000 units. Its sales surpassed 670,000 copies by the end of March 2002.

References

External links
 
  

2001 video games
Action-adventure games
Game Boy Advance games
GameCube games
Superhero video games
PlayStation 2 games
Ubisoft games
Vengeance
Vengeance
Video games developed in Canada
Video games developed in China
Video games set in the United States
Windows games
Xbox games